Dosha (IAST: doṣa) is a central term in Ayurveda originating from Sanskrit, which can be translated as "that which can cause problems" (literally meaning "fault" or "defect"), and which refers to three categories or types of substances that are believed to be present in a person's body and mind. Beginning with twentieth-century Ayurvedic literature, the "three-dosha theory" has described how the quantities and qualities of three fundamental types of substances called wind, bile, and phlegm fluctuate in the body according to the seasons, time of day, process of digestion, and several other factors and thereby determine changing conditions of growth, aging, health, and disease.

Doshas are considered to shape the physical body according to a natural constitution established at birth, determined by the constitutions of the parents as well as the time of conception and other factors. This natural constitution represents the healthy norm for a balanced state for a particular individual. The particular ratio of the doshas in a person's natural constitution is associated with determining their mind-body type including various physiological and psychological characteristics such as physical appearance, physique, and personality.

The Ayurvedic three-dosha theory is often compared to European humorism although it is a distinct system with a separate history. The three-dosha theory has also been compared to astrology and physiognomy in similarly deriving its tenets from ancient philosophy and superstitions. Using them to diagnose or treat disease is considered pseudoscientific.

Role in disease, Roga
Doshas are purely imaginary; their existence is not supported by any evidence.

The Ayurvedic notion of doshas describes how bad habits, wrong diet, overwork, etc. may cause relative deficiencies or excesses which cause them to become imbalanced in relation to the natural constitution resulting in a current condition which may potentially lead to disease. Similarly, excess  is blamed for blood toxicity, inflammation, and infection.

Principles

The doshas derive their qualities from the five elements of classical Indian philosophy.

 Vāta or vata is characterized by the properties of dry, cold, light, minute, and movement. All movement in the body is due to properties of vata. Pain is the characteristic feature of deranged vata. Some of the diseases connected to unbalanced vata are flatulence, gout, rheumatism, etc. Vāta is the normal Sanskrit word meaning "air" or "wind", and was so understood in pre-modern Sanskrit treatises on Ayurveda.   Some modern interpreters prefer not to translate Vata as air, but rather to equated it with a modern metabolic process or substance.
 Pitta represents metabolism; It is characterized by heat, moistness, liquidity, and sharpness and sourness. Its chief quality is heat. It is the energy principle which uses bile to direct digestion and enhance metabolism. Unbalanced pitta is primarily characterized by body heat or a burning sensation and redness.  Pitta is the normal Sanskrit word meaning "bile". It is etymologically related to the Sanskrit word pīta "yellow".
 Kapha is the watery element. It is a combination of earth and water. It is characterized by heaviness, coldness, tenderness, softness, slowness, lubrication, and the carrier of nutrients. It is the nourishing element of the body. All soft organs are made by kapha and it plays an important role in the perception of taste together with nourishment and lubrication.  Kapha is the normal Sanskrit word meaning "phlegm".

Prana, tejas, and ojas
Yoga is a set of disciplines, some that aim to balance and transform energies of the psyche. Unlike the doshas, which in excess create diseases, this is believed to promote health, creativity and well-being.

Ultimately, Ayurveda seeks to reduce disease, particularly those that are chronic, and increase positive health in the body and mind via these three vital essences that aid in renewal and transformation. Increased  is associated with enthusiasm, adaptability and creativity, all of which are considered necessary when pursuing a spiritual path in yoga and to enable one to perform.  is claimed to provide courage, fearlessness and insight and to be  important when making decisions. Lastly,  is considered to create peace, confidence and patience to maintain consistent development and sustain continued effort. Aims to achieve this include Ayurvedic diet, tonic herbs, control of the senses, a devotion and most importantly celibacy.

Criticism 
Writing in the Skeptical Inquirer, Harriet Hall likened dosha to horoscope. She found that different online dosha websites gave different results in personalized quizzes, and summarized that "Ayurveda is basically superstition mixed with a soupçon of practical health advice." Alternative medicines used in Ayurveda treatments have been found to contain harmful levels of lead, mercury and other heavy metals.

See also
 Traditional Tibetan medicine#Three principles of function
 Dhātu (Ayurveda)

References

Ayurveda
Tamil culture
Traditional medicine in India
Alternative medical systems